Fillmore Inlet is an inlet in Southeast Alaska, U.S.A. The inlet separates Fillmore Island from the mainland. It was first charted in 1793 by George Vancouver.

References

Inlets of Alaska
Bodies of water of Ketchikan Gateway Borough, Alaska